The Apocalypse of Peter (or Revelation of Peter) is an early Christian text of the 2nd century and an example of apocalyptic literature with Hellenistic overtones. It is not included in the standard canon of the New Testament, but is mentioned in the Muratorian fragment, the oldest surviving list of New Testament books, which also states that some authorities would not have it read in church. The text is extant in two incomplete versions of a lost Greek original, a later Greek version and an Ethiopic version, which diverge considerably.  The work is classed as part of New Testament apocrypha.

The Apocalypse of Peter is purportedly written by the disciple Peter and describes a divine vision by Christ.  After inquiring for signs of the Second Coming of Jesus (parousia), the work delves into a katabasis (vision of the afterlife), and details both heavenly bliss for the saved and infernal punishments for the damned.  In particular, the punishments are graphically described in a physical sense, and loosely correspond to lex talonis ("an eye for an eye"): blasphemers are hung by their tongues, liars who bear false witness have their lips cut off; callous rich people are made to wear rags and be pierced by sharp fiery stones as would beggars; and so on.  It is an early example of the same genre of the more famous Divine Comedy of Dante, wherein the protagonist takes a tour of the realms of the afterlife.

Manuscript history
Before 1886, the Apocalypse of Peter had been known only through quotations and references in early Christian writings. In addition, some common lost source had been necessary to account for closely parallel passages in such apocalyptic Christian literature as the Apocalypse of Esdras, the Apocalypse of Paul, and the Passion of Saint Perpetua, although identification of this lost source with the Apocalypse of Peter was not known.

A fragmented Koine Greek manuscript was discovered during excavations initiated by Gaston Maspéro during the 1886–87 season in a desert necropolis at Akhmim in Upper Egypt. The fragment consisted of parchment leaves of the Greek version that was claimed to be deposited in the grave of a Christian monk of the 8th or 9th century. The manuscript is in the Coptic Museum in Old Cairo. From 1907–1910, a large set of documents of Clementine literature in Ethiopic were published along with translations into French.<ref>The Ethiopic text, with a French translation, was published by S. Grébaut, Littérature éthiopienne pseudo-Clémentine", Revue de l'Orient Chrétien, new series, 15 (1910), 198–214, 307–23.</ref>  M. R. James realized in 1910 that there was a strong correspondence with the Akhmim Apocalypse of Peter, and that these were Ethiopic versions of the same work.  Further Ethiopic copies have been discovered since.  These Ethiopic versions appear to have been translated from Arabic, which itself was translated from the lost Greek original.  Two other short Greek fragments of the work have been discovered: a 5th-century fragment at the Bodleian that had been discovered in Egypt in 1895, and the Rainer fragment at the Rainer collection in Vienna which perhaps comes from the 3rd or 4th century.The Greek Akhmim text was printed by A. Lods, "L'evangile et l'apocalypse de Pierre", Mémoires publiés par les membres de la mission archéologique au Caire, 9, M.U. Bouriant, ed. (1892:2142-46); the Greek fragments were published by M.R. James, "A new text of the Apocalypse of Peter II", JTS 12 (1910/11:367-68).  These fragments offer significant variations from the other versions.

As compiled by William MacComber and others, the number of Ethiopic manuscripts of this same work continue to grow. The Ethiopic work is of colossal size and post-conciliar provenance, and many variations exist.  In many Ethiopic manuscripts, the Apocalypse of Peter forms the first part of new combined works; two notable ones are "The Second Coming of Christ and the Resurrection of the Dead" and "The Mystery of the Judgment of Sinners."

In general, most scholars believe that the Ethiopic versions we have today are closer to the original manuscript, while the Greek manuscript discovered at Akhmim is a later and edited version.  This is for a number of reasons: the Akhmim version is shorter, while the Ethiopic matches the claimed line count from the Stichometry of Nicephorus; patristic references and quotes seem to match the Ethiopic version better; the Ethiopic matches better with the Rainer and Bodleian Greek fragments; and the Akhmim version seems to be attempting to integrate the Apocalypse with the Gospel of Peter (also in the Akhmim manuscript), which would naturally result in revisions.

Dating

The Apocalypse of Peter seems to have been written between 100 AD and 150 AD.  The terminus post quem—the point after which we know the Apocalypse of Peter must have been written—is shown by its use (in Chapter 3) of 4 Esdras, which was written about 100 AD.  If the Apocalypse was used by Clement or the author of the Sibylline Oracles, then it must have been in existence by 150 AD.

The Muratorian fragment is the earliest existing list of canonical sacred writings of what would eventually be called the New Testament.  The fragment is generally dated to the last quarter of the 2nd century (c. 175–200).  It gives a list of works read in the Christian churches that is similar to the modern accepted canon; however, it also includes the Apocalypse of Peter. The Muratorian fragment states: "the Apocalypses also of John and Peter only do we receive, which some among us would not have read in church." (The existence of other, non "received" Apocalypses is implied, for several early apocryphal ones are known: see Apocalyptic literature.) The scholars Oscar Skarsaune and Richard Bauckham makes a case for dating the composition to the Bar Kochba revolt (132–136).

Content
The Apocalypse of Peter is framed as a discourse of the Risen Christ to his faithful.  In the Ethiopic version, a vision of hell granted to Peter is discussed followed by a vision of heaven; in the Akhmim fragment, the order is reversed.  In the form of a Greek katabasis or nekyia, it goes into elaborate detail about the punishment in hell for each type of crime and the pleasures given in heaven for each virtue.

In the opening, the disciples ask for signs of the Second Coming (parousia) while on Mount Zion.  The Gospel parables of the budding fig tree and the barren fig tree, partly selected from the "Little Apocalypse" of Matthew 24, appear only in the Ethiopic version (ch. 2). The two parables are joined, and the setting "in the summer" has been transferred to "the end of the world", in a detailed allegory in which the tree becomes Israel and the flourishing shoots become Jews who have adopted Jesus as Messiah and achieve martyrdom.  It is possible this was edited out of the Greek version due to incipient anti-Jewish tensions in the church; a depiction of Jews converting and Israel being especially blessed may not have fit the mood in the 4th and 5th centuries of the Church as some Christians strongly repudiated Judaism.

The punishments in the vision closely correspond to the past sinful actions, often with a correspondence between the body part that sinned and the body part that is tortured.  It is a loose version of the Jewish notion of an eye for an eye, that the punishment may fit the crime..  Note that Ehrman contests the scholarly opinion of the use of lex talionis, focusing more on bodily correspondence, as the punishments described are far more severe than the original crime - which goes against the idea of punishments being commensurate to the damage or pain done within "an eye for an eye."  The phrase "each according to his deed" appears five times in the Ethiopic version to explain the punishments.  Many of the punishments are overseen by Ezrael the Angel of Wrath (most likely the angel Azrael, although it is possibly a corrupt reference to the angel Sariel); the angel Uriel is also involved as well, largely in the process of resurrecting the dead into their new bodies.   Punishments in hell according to the vision include:

The vision of heaven is shorter than the depiction of hell.  In heaven, people have pure milky white skin, curly hair, and are generally beautiful. The earth blooms with everlasting flowers and spices. People wear shiny clothes made of light, like the angels. Everyone sings in choral prayer.

In the Ethiopic version, the account closes with an account of the Ascension of Jesus on the mountain from chapters 15–17.  As the Akhmim version moved the Apocalypse earlier, to when Jesus was still alive, it is not in the Akhmim version.

Prayers for those in hell
One theological issue of note appears only in the version of the text in the 3rd century Rainer Fragment, the earliest fragment of the text.  Its chapter 14 describes the salvation of condemned sinners for whom the righteous pray:

While not found in later manuscripts, this reading was likely original to the text, as it agrees with a quotation in the Sibylline Oracles:

Other 2nd century parallel passages possibly influenced by this are found in the Epistle of the Apostles, the Coptic Apocalypse of Elijah, and possibly the Acts of Paul.

The passage also makes literary sense, as it is a follow up to a passage in Chapter 3 where Jesus initially rebukes Peter who expresses horror at the suffering in hell; Richard Bauckham suggests that this is because it must be the victims who were harmed that request mercy, not Peter.  While not directly endorsing universal salvation, it does suggest that salvation will eventually reach as far as the compassion of the elect.  Some of the Ethiopic manuscripts written in the 9th century and beyond include new extensions that also describe a great act of divine mercy to come that will rescue (some? all?) sinners from hell.

Influences, genre, and related works
Predecessors
Much of the original scholarship on the Apocalypse was on determining its predecessor influences.  The first studies generally emphasized its Hellenistic philosophy roots in Greek traditions, such as those by Albrecht Dieterich in 1893, who on the basis of the Akhmim manuscript alone postulated a general Orphic cultural context in the attention focused on the house of the dead.  Later scholarship by Martha Himmelfarb and others has emphasized the strong Jewish roots of the Apocalypse of Peter as well; it seems that apocalypses were a popular genre among Jews after the destruction of the Temple in 70 AD.  Much of the Apocalypse of Peter may be based on or influenced by these lost Jewish apocalypses.  The book directly cites 4 Esdras.  The author also appears to be familiar with the Gospel of Matthew and no other; a line in Chapter 16 has Peter realizing the meaning of the Beatitude quote that "Blessed are those who are persecuted for righteousness's sake, for theirs is the kingdom of Heaven."

Contemporary work
The opening setting of the resurrected Jesus giving further insights to the Apostles, usually on a mountain, followed by an account of Jesus's ascension, appears to have been a popular setting in 2nd century Christian works.  The genre is sometimes called a "dialogue Gospel", and is seen in works such as the Epistle of the Apostles, the Questions of Bartholomew, and various Gnostic works such as the Pistis Sophia.

The Apocalypse of Peter also fits into the same genre as Clementine literature that was popular in Alexandria, despite Clement not appearing directly.  The Ethiopic manuscripts that Grébaut found the Ethiopic manuscripts of were mixed in with other Clementine literature, which usually featured Peter prominently.

Among work that was eventually canonized in the New Testament, the Apocalypse of Peter shows a close resemblance in ideas with the Second Epistle of Peter, to the extent that many scholars believe one had copied passages from the other due to the number of close parallels.  Conversely, the Apocalypse of Peter differs from the Apocalypse of John in putting far more stress on the afterlife and divine rewards and punishments than Revelation's focus on a cosmic battle between good and evil.

Later influence
The Sibylline Oracles, popular among Roman Christians, seems to directly quote the Apocalypse of Peter. The Acts of Perpetua and the visions narrated in the Acts of Thomas also appear to quote or reference the Apocalypse of Peter. 

The Apocalypse of Peter is one of the earliest examples of a Christian-Jewish katabasis, a genre of explicit depictions of heaven and hell.  Later works inspired by it include the Apocalypse of Thomas in the 2nd–4th century, and more importantly, the Apocalypse of Paul in the 4th century.  Despite a lack of "official" approval, the Apocalypse of Paul would go on to be popular for centuries, possibly due to its popularity among the medieval monks that copied and preserved manuscripts in the turbulent centuries following the fall of the Western Roman Empire.  Most famously, Dante Alighieri's Divine Comedy would become extremely popular and celebrated in the 14th century and beyond.  Directly or indirectly, the Apocalypse of Peter was the parent and grandparent of these influential visions of the afterlife.

Literary merits
19th and 20th century scholars consider the work rather intellectually simple and naive; dramatic and gripping, but not necessarily a coherent story.  Still, the Apocalypse of Peter was popular and seemed to have a wide audience in its time.  M. R. James remarked that his impression was that educated Christians of the later Roman period "realized it was a gross and vulgar book" which might have partially explained a lack of elite enthusiasm for canonizing it later.

Debate over canonicity
The Apocalypse of Peter was ultimately not included in the New Testament, but appears to have been one of the borderline works that came closest to being included, along with the Shepherd of Hermas.  As discussed in dating the Apocalypse of Peter, the Muratorian fragment mentions the Apocalypse, but also states that "some among us would not have read in church."  Both the Apocalypse of Peter and Apocalypse of John appear to have been controversial, with some churches of the 2nd and 3rd centuries using them and others not.  Clement of Alexandria appears to have considered the Apocalypse of Peter to be holy scripture. Eusebius personally found the work dubious, but his book Church History describes a lost work of Clement's, the Hypotyposes (Outlines), that gave "abbreviated discussions of the whole of the registered divine writings, without passing over the disputed [writings] — I mean Jude and the rest of the general letters, and the Letter of Barnabas, and the so-called Apocalypse of Peter."Clement 41.1–2 48.1 correspond with the Ethiopian text M. R. James in introduction to Translation and Introduction to Apocalypse of Peter. The Apocryphal New Testament (Oxford: Clarendon Press, 1924)  The Stichometry of Nicephorus also lists it as a used if disputed book.  Although the numerous references to it attest that it was in wide circulation in the 2nd century, the Apocalypse of Peter was ultimately not accepted into the Christian canon.  The reason why is not entirely clear, although considering the reservations various church authors had on the Apocalypse of John (that is, the Book of Revelation), likely similar considerations were in play.  As late as the 5th century, Sozomen indicates that some churches in Palestine used it in his time, but by then, it seems to have been considered inauthentic by most Christians.

One hypothesis for why the Apocalypse of Peter failed to gain enough support to be canonized is that its view on the afterlife was too close to endorsing Christian universalism.  The passage in the Rainer Fragment that dead saints, seeing the torment of sinners and heretics from heaven, could ask God for mercy, and these damned souls could be retroactively baptized and saved, had significant theological implications.  Presumably, all of hell could eventually be emptied in such a manner; M. R. James suggested that the original Apocalypse of Peter may well have suggested universal salvation after a period of cleansing suffering in hell.  This ran against the stance of many Church theologians of the 3rd, 4th, and 5th centuries who strongly felt that salvation and damnation were eternal and strictly based on actions and beliefs while alive.  Augustine of Hippo, in his work City of God, specifically advocates against arguments based on similar logic to what is seen in the Rainer passage.   Such a system, where saints could at least pray their friends and family out of hell, and possibly any damned soul, would have been considered incorrect at best, and heretical at worst to these views.  Bart Ehrman agrees with James and proposes that the Rainer fragment reading was the original one; and that this passage was not copied by later scribes who felt it was in error, hence not appearing in later manuscripts.  He believes that the damage to the book's reputation was already done, however.  The Origenist Controversies of the 4th and 5th centuries retroactively condemned much of the thought of Origen, particularly his belief in universal salvation, and this anti-Origen movement was at least part of why the book was not included in later canon lists.

Notes

References

Bibliography
 
 

Further reading
 Eileen Gardiner, Visions of Heaven and Hell Before Dante (New York: Italica Press, 1989), pp. 1–12, provides an English translation of the Ethiopic text.

External links
 , translation by M. R. James in the 1924 book The Apocryphal New Testament, with quotation from Sibylline Oracles as well
 The Apocalypse of Peter (Greek Akhmim Fragment Text) transcribed by Mark Goodacre from E. Klostermann's edition (HTML, Word, PDF)
 Pardee, Cambry. "Apocalypse of Peter." e-Clavis: Christian Apocrypha''
 Bibliography of works on the Apocalypse of Peter

2nd-century Christian texts
1886 archaeological discoveries
Peter, Apocalypse of
Christian apocalyptic writings
Petrine-related books
Texts in Koine Greek
Egyptian Museum
Antilegomena
Katabasis